The Wesel citadel is the largest intact fortification system of the Rhineland and was built 1688–1722 in Wesel according to plans by Johan de Corbin, in the form of a pentagonal star, with each point of the star being a bastion. The citadel was the core of the fortress of Wesel. It is currently used as a cultural centre.

Architecture

The main architectural features of the citadel can be derived from the principles of Sébastien Le Prestre de Vauban, the most prominent constructor of fortifications at the time. The construction costs of the phase built between 1668 and 1700 are estimated at 373,452 Reichsthaler. In subsequent years also, a substantial amount of funds flowed into the construction, for the years 1701 and 1702 the costs were 221,600 Reichsthaler. The entire Wesel fortification was at this time armed with 250 cannons.

In 1687 Frederick William I of Brandenburg ordered the construction of a citadel to turn Wesel into a fortified city. It was to be built in the south of the city and be connected to the existing city defences, and be equipped with 5 bastions and five ravelins. The main gate of the citadel was built in 1718. Probably before the mid-18th century, the citadel was expanded and strengthened on its south and east sides. In the period when the French occupied it (1805–1814), they constructed in the citadel a 2-floor brick building, which still stands today: the old Kaserne VIII (Barracks VIII).

The main gate is impressive in design; in the southern wing, there is a prison cell, in which amongst others eleven of Ferdinand von Schill's officers were detained.

Current use

Due to their dismantling after World War I in 1919-1920, the old fortifications are no longer present today. Especially in the direction of the Rhine and the Lippe, where the enemy would have come from, the fortifications have disappeared. The only thing that reminds of the old gate there is a street name.

After its dismantlement in 1919/1920 after World War I, the following buildings remained:

 Main gate with curtain wall, bridge, tenaille, and trenches from 1718 (Jean de Bodt), renovated in 1823. Now contains the "Städtische Museum Abteilung Schillkasematte" (Local Museum Schill Case Matts). This gate is also fortified, but actually represented the connection to the city. 
 Officers' prison from 1727 (now privately owned)
 Garrison bakery no. II from 1809. Houses the local archive with the restoration department.
 Barracks no. VIII from 1809.  Was renovated for the "Musik- und Kunstschule" (Music and Art School) of the city.
 Körner magazine from 1835. This now contains the Prussian Museum of North Rhine Westphalia.

List of governors 
 1675  Freiherr Alexander von Spaen,  Generalfeldmarschall.
 1692  Friedrich von Heiden (1633-1706), General of the Infantry
 1702  Carl Philipp Reichsgraf von Wylich und Lottum (1650–1719), Generalfeldmarschall.
 1719  Freiherr  Johann Sigismund von Heyden. (†1730)
 1730  Konrad Heinrich von der Mosel (1663-1733) General-Leutnant 
 1733  Hans Christoph von Bardeleben, General-Major (†1736)
 175?  Friedrich Wilhelm von Dossow (1669-1758), General of the Infantry
 1756  Friedrich von Hessen-Kassel, General-Leutnant
 1757  Heinrich August de la Motte Fouqué (1698-1774), General-Leutnant
 1787-1788 Friedrich Wilhelm von Gaudi (1725-1788), General-Leutnant
 1790  Martin Ernst von Schlieffen (1732-1825), General-Leutnant
 1792  Alexander Friedrich von Woldeck (1720-1795), General-Leutnant
 1796  Friedrich August Albrecht von Tschirschky (1734–1799), Generalmajor
 1797  Landgraf Wilhelm von Hessen-Kassel, Generalfeldmarschall.

External links 
 Website of the city; Citadel
 Preußen-Museum Nordrhein-Westfalen

Forts in Germany
Local museums in Germany
Museums in North Rhine-Westphalia
Buildings and structures in Wesel (district)
Wesel